Iben Amelieh Emine Dorner (previously Østergaard) (born 19 October 1978) is a Danish actress and voice artist.

Education
Dorner graduated from the University of Copenhagen with a Bachelor of Arts in theatre and rhetoric in 2003. She later went to drama school at Odense Teater and graduated in 2007. In her first year at Odense Teater, she worked as part of an actor ensemble at a minor scene called Teater Momentum.

Acting career
Dorner played the role of Electra at Odense Teater's staging of the Oresteia and Mrs. Martins in The Bald Singer in the 2008/2009 theatre season. She made her film debut playing Anders Matthesen's girlfriend in the 2009 film Sorte Kugler, for which she received a Zulu award for Best Supporting Actress in 2010.

Dorner has also participated in a number of television productions, including Borgen, and she has since 2002 been a voice artist. Her work in that field has included voicing Sam in the Danish version of Totally Spies, as well as Arcee in the Danish version of Transformers: Prime.

Selected filmography

Film

Television

References

External links
 

Living people
1978 births
21st-century Danish actresses
Danish film actresses
Danish television actresses
People from Holstebro